Colchicum zahnii is a species of plant in the genus Colchicum native to southern Greece. It blooms in mid-autumn from rhizomatous corms. The flowers can be variable coloured, being a pale purple-pink to white and are often held wide open.  The leaves are produced at flowering time and usually number 2 to 3. This species is similar to Colchicum boissieri in that the corms grow into large patches, rather than tight clumps like Colchicum speciosum or Colchicum autumnale.

References

zahnii
Plants described in 1904